Raniganj Assembly constituency is an assembly constituency in Paschim Bardhaman district in the Indian state of West Bengal.

Overview
As per orders of the Delimitation Commission, No. 278, Raniganj assembly constituency covers Ward nos. 33–37, 88-93 of Asansol Municipal Corporation and Andal community development block.

Raniganj assembly segment is part of No. 40 Asansol (Lok Sabha constituency).

Members of Legislative Assembly

Election results

2021

2016

2011

.# Swing calculated on Congress+Trinamool Congress vote percentages in 2006 taken together.

1977–2006
In the 2006 state assembly election, the Raniganj assembly seat was won by Haradhan Jha of CPI (M). He defeated his nearest rival Jitendra Tiwari of Trinamool Congress. Contests in most years were multi cornered but only winners and runners are being mentioned. In 2001, 1996, 1991 and 1987, Bansa Gopal Chowdhury of CPI (M) won the seat defeating his nearest rivals Sampa Sarkar, Senapati Mondal, Sankar Dutta and Kalyani Biswas (all of Congress) in the respective years. In 1982 and 1977, Haradhan Roy of CPI (M) defeated Hare Krishna Goswami and Sarojakshya Mukherjee (both of Congress) in the respective years.

1951–1972
Haradhan Roy of CPI(M) won in 1972, 1971, 1969 and 1967. Lakhan Bagdi of CPI won in 1962. The Raniganj seat was not there in 1957. In independent India's first election in 1951, Banku Behari Mandal of Congress won the Raniganj seat.

References

Politics of Paschim Bardhaman district
Assembly constituencies of West Bengal